Tallinna FC Zapoos is an Estonian football club based in Tallinn. Founded in January 2013, they currently play in the III Liiga, the fifth tier of Estonian football. They also joined the IV Liiga in 2017 and before that they played in Rahvaliiga.

Players

Current squad
 ''As of 31 July 2018.

Statistics

League and Cup

References

Football clubs in Estonia
Association football clubs established in 2013